In Greek mythology, Aora (Ancient Greek: Ἀώρας) was a nymph by whom the town of Aoros in Crete was named after.

Note

References 

 Stephanus of Byzantium, Stephani Byzantii Ethnicorum quae supersunt, edited by August Meineike (1790-1870), published 1849. A few entries from this important ancient handbook of place names have been translated by Brady Kiesling. Online version at the Topos Text Project.

Nymphs